André Declerck (17 August 1919 – 13 September 1967) was a Belgian racing cyclist. He rode in the 1948 Tour de France. He finished in sixth place in the 1949 Paris–Roubaix and fourth in the 1951 Paris–Roubaix.

References

External links

1919 births
1967 deaths
Belgian male cyclists
People from Koekelare
Cyclists from West Flanders